Chenglong Wetlands is a wetland in Kouhu Township, Yunlin County, Taiwan.

History
The wetland was formed due to the low altitude of the lower Hukou Village of Kouhu Township and the overuse of groundwater over the years. Those factors contributed to the land subsidence of the area which make it prone to flooding. More sea water encroachment is also brought by the frequent typhoons happening in Taiwan, which eventually turned the area into a wetland.

Geology
The wetland spans over an area of 171 hectares.

See also
 List of tourist attractions in Taiwan

References

Landforms of Yunlin County
Wetlands of Taiwan